The WorldWired Tour was a concert tour by American heavy metal band Metallica in support of their tenth studio album Hardwired... to Self-Destruct, which was released on November 18, 2016. It is also their first worldwide tour after the World Magnetic Tour six years earlier.

Background 
The tour started on October 26, 2016, in Puerto Rico, followed by four more dates on the Latin American tour.

A performance at the 59th annual Grammy Awards on February 12, 2017, was also a part of the tour.

In 2018, the WorldWired Tour reached another $67.9 million from 37 shows, 24 in Europe and 13 in North America. The tour has grossed $426.9 million, from 139 concerts three years since it began in 2016 and now is the ninth highest-grossing tour of all time.

The tour ended on August 25, 2019 in Mannheim, Germany. The band had plans to continue the tour in late 2019 and early 2020, but the tour dates in Australia were cancelled because of issues James had with alcohol, while the South American leg was postponed to 2022 due to COVID-19 pandemic.

Setlist 
The following setlist was performed at the Commonwealth Stadium in Edmonton, and is not intended to represent all of the shows on tour.

 "Hardwired"
 "Atlas, Rise!"
 "For Whom the Bell Tolls"
 "The Memory Remains"
 "The Unforgiven"
 "Now That We're Dead"
 "Moth Into Flame"
 "Wherever I May Roam"
 "Halo on Fire"
 "Hit the Lights"
 "Sad but True"
 "One"
 "Master of Puppets"
 "Fade to Black"
 "Seek & Destroy"
Encore
 "Blackened"
 "Nothing Else Matters"
 "Enter Sandman"

Kirk/Rob doodle 
In 2017, Kirk Hammett and Rob Trujillo began to cover songs written by artists from the region in which the concert was being performed.

Tour dates

Cancelled and postponed shows

Personnel 
James Hetfield – lead vocals, rhythm guitar, acoustic guitar
Lars Ulrich – drums
Kirk Hammett – lead guitar, backing vocals
Robert Trujillo – bass guitar, backing vocals

Notes

References 

Metallica concert tours
2016 concert tours
2017 concert tours
2018 concert tours
2019 concert tours
Concert tours postponed due to the COVID-19 pandemic